The band-tailed oropendola (Cacicus latirostris) is a species of bird in the family Icteridae.

It is found at low densities in the western Amazon in Brazil, Ecuador, Peru and far southern Colombia.

References

band-tailed oropendola
Birds of the Amazon Basin
Birds of the Ecuadorian Amazon
Birds of the Peruvian Amazon
band-tailed oropendola
Taxonomy articles created by Polbot